Gerona is a populated centre and suburb of Pan de Azúcar in the southwest of the Maldonado Department in Uruguay.

Geography

Population
In 2011 Gerona had a population of 679.
 
Source: Instituto Nacional de Estadística de Uruguay

See also
 Maldonado Department

References

External links
INE map of Pan de Azúcar and Gerona

Populated places in the Maldonado Department